Piotr Jerzy Pankanin (16 May 1948 – 16 November 2022) was a Polish chemist and politician. A member of Solidarity and later the Labour Union, he served in the Senate from 1991 to 1993 and the Sejm from 1993 to 1997.

Pankanin died on 16 November 2022, at the age of 74.

References

1948 births
2022 deaths
Freedom Union (Poland) politicians
Members of the Senate of Poland 1991–1993
Nicolaus Copernicus University in Toruń alumni
People from Złotów